Louis Jeandet (28 August 1900–18 September 1967) was a French rower. He competed in the men's eight event at the 1928 Summer Olympics.

References

External links

1900 births
1967 deaths
French male rowers
Olympic rowers of France
Rowers at the 1928 Summer Olympics